José Humberto Eslava "Pepe" Cáceres (March 16, 1935 - August 16, 1987) was a Colombian bullfighter. Born in Honda, Tolima, Colombia, he is often regarded as one of the finest bullfighters ever and the best-known bullfighter Colombia has ever produced. He was also a breeder of bulls and bullfighting organizer.

Early life and education

During his younger years, Cáceres was more inclined to football than bullfighting. In 1949 he witnessed a bullfight in Bogotá and then decided to become a torero. He debuted as a bullfighter on November 1, 1952 and traveled to Spain in 1955. He debuted in Málaga, Spain on April 10, 1955 and was injured by the first bull he faced. However, he proceeded to dispatch ten young bulls in his first season with great success. He took the alternative in the Feria de Abril at the Maestranza de Sevilla on September 30, 1956, with his godfather, Antonio Bienvenida. His most famous victories over his long career were in Mexico and the Monumental Plaza de Toros in Bogota.

Career

In his career he had been seriously wounded at least five times yet he could not bring himself to retire. He had remarked in an interview "I think all bullfighters live with the hope of continuing in the bullfighting atmosphere, to prolong the taurine feast". He was seriously injured a sixth time, a goring that he received from the bull "Monín" on July 20, 1987 in Sogamoso, Colombia. He was trapped up against the boards and was mauled by the bull. It resulted in a pierced lung that proved to be fatal. He had been a professional bullfighter for 31 years and had announced his retirement for the next year.

As a bullfighter, he is considered one of the best in the use of the cape, but his difficulty to kill was always his greatest professional limitation. He often refused to set 'flags' in the bulls he fought. The set known as Cacerina, bringing down the bull while riding it at the time of the fatal stab, was his creation.

Awards and recognitions

He is honoured by a statue outside the Santamaría Bullring in Bogotá.

Personal life

Pepe Cáceres married Olga Lucia Botero, the 1962 Colombian  candidate to Miss Universe. Together, they had two children: Francisco and Adriana. Pepe Cáceres later married actress Lyda Zamora and divorced. With her he had two children, Lyda Eugenia and José Andrés. He then married Valle del Cauca artist Olga Lucía Vélez. He had three children with her: Manuela, Natasha and Sebastián, a Colombian television actor.

References

1935 births
1987 deaths
People from Honda, Tolima
Colombian bullfighters
20th-century Colombian people